Bloch Peak is a prominent peak in the Deep Freeze Range, Victoria Land, between Priestley Glacier and the west part of Tourmaline Plateau. It was named by the Advisory Committee on Antarctic Names in 1990 after Erich Bloch, Director, National Science Foundation, 1984–90. The Foundation, through its Office of Polar Programs, is responsible for the development of the U.S. Antarctic Program.

References
 

Mountains of Victoria Land
Scott Coast